In signal processing and related disciplines, aliasing is an effect that causes different signals to become indistinguishable (or aliases of one another) when sampled. It also often refers to the distortion or artifact that results when a signal reconstructed from samples is different from the original continuous signal.

Aliasing can occur in signals sampled in time, for instance digital audio, or the stroboscopic effect, and is referred to as temporal aliasing.  It can also occur in spatially sampled signals (e.g. moiré patterns in digital images); this type of aliasing is called spatial aliasing.

Aliasing is generally avoided by applying low-pass filters or anti-aliasing filters (AAF) to the input signal before sampling and when converting a signal from a higher to a lower sampling rate. Suitable reconstruction filtering should then be used when restoring the sampled signal to the continuous domain or converting a signal from a lower to a higher sampling rate. For spatial anti-aliasing, the types of anti-aliasing include fast approximate anti-aliasing (FXAA), multisample anti-aliasing, and supersampling.

Description 

When a digital image is viewed, a reconstruction is performed by a display or printer device, and by the eyes and the brain. If the image data is processed in some way during sampling or reconstruction, the reconstructed image will differ from the original image, and an alias is seen.

An example of spatial aliasing is the moiré pattern observed in a poorly pixelized image of a brick wall. Spatial anti-aliasing techniques avoid such poor pixelizations. Aliasing can be caused either by the sampling stage or the reconstruction stage; these may be distinguished by calling sampling aliasing  prealiasing and reconstruction aliasing  postaliasing.

Temporal aliasing is a major concern in the sampling of video and audio signals. Music, for instance, may contain high-frequency components that are inaudible to humans. If a piece of music is sampled at 32,000 samples per second (Hz), any frequency components at or above 16,000 Hz (the Nyquist frequency for this sampling rate) will cause aliasing when the music is reproduced by a digital-to-analog converter (DAC). The high frequencies in the analog signal will appear as lower frequencies (wrong alias) in the recorded digital sample and, hence, cannot be reproduced by the DAC.  To prevent this, an anti-aliasing filter is used to remove components above the Nyquist frequency prior to sampling.

In video or cinematography, temporal aliasing results from the limited frame rate, and causes the wagon-wheel effect, whereby a spoked wheel appears to rotate too slowly or even backwards. Aliasing has changed its apparent frequency of rotation. A reversal of direction can be described as a negative frequency.  Temporal aliasing frequencies in video and cinematography are determined by the frame rate of the camera, but the relative intensity of the aliased frequencies is determined by the shutter timing (exposure time) or the use of a temporal aliasing reduction filter during filming.

Like the video camera, most sampling schemes are periodic; that is, they have a characteristic sampling frequency in time or in space. Digital cameras provide a certain number of samples (pixels) per degree or per radian, or samples per mm in the focal plane of the camera. Audio signals are sampled (digitized) with an analog-to-digital converter, which produces a constant number of samples per second. Some of the most dramatic and subtle examples of aliasing occur when the signal being sampled also has periodic content.

Bandlimited functions 

Actual signals have a finite duration and their frequency content, as defined by the Fourier transform, has no upper bound. Some amount of aliasing always occurs when such functions are sampled. Functions whose frequency content is bounded (bandlimited) have an infinite duration in the time domain. If sampled at a high enough rate, determined by the bandwidth, the original function can, in theory, be perfectly reconstructed from the infinite set of samples.

Bandpass signals 

Sometimes aliasing is used intentionally on signals with no low-frequency content, called bandpass signals. Undersampling, which creates low-frequency aliases, can produce the same result, with less effort, as frequency-shifting the signal to lower frequencies before sampling at the lower rate. Some digital channelizers exploit aliasing in this way for computational efficiency. 
(See Sampling (signal processing), Nyquist rate (relative to sampling), and Filter bank.)

Sampling sinusoidal functions 

Sinusoids are an important type of periodic function, because realistic signals are often modeled as the summation of many sinusoids of different frequencies and different amplitudes (for example, with a Fourier series or transform). Understanding what aliasing does to the individual sinusoids is useful in understanding what happens to their sum.

When sampling a function at frequency  (intervals ), the following functions of time  yield identical sets of samples: }.  A frequency spectrum of the samples produces equally strong responses at all those frequencies.  Without collateral information, the frequency of the original function is ambiguous.  So the functions and their frequencies are said to be aliases of each other.  Noting the trigonometric identity:

we can write all the alias frequencies as positive values:  .  For example, a snapshot of the lower right frame of Fig.2 shows a component at the actual frequency  and another component at alias .  As  increases during the animation,   decreases.  The point at which they are equal  is an axis of symmetry called the folding frequency, also known as Nyquist frequency.

Aliasing matters when one attempts to reconstruct the original waveform from its samples.  The most common reconstruction technique produces the smallest of the  frequencies.  So it is usually important that  be the unique minimum.  A necessary and sufficient condition for that is  called the Nyquist condition.  The lower left frame of Fig.2 depicts the typical reconstruction result of the available samples.  Until  exceeds the Nyquist frequency, the reconstruction matches the actual waveform (upper left frame).  After that, it is the low frequency alias of the upper frame.

Folding 
The figures below offer additional depictions of aliasing, due to sampling.  A graph of amplitude vs frequency (not time) for a single sinusoid at frequency    and some of its aliases at      and    would look like the 4 black dots in Fig.3.  The red lines depict the paths (loci) of the 4 dots if we were to adjust the frequency and amplitude of the sinusoid along the solid red segment (between    and  ).  No matter what function we choose to change the amplitude vs frequency, the graph will exhibit symmetry between 0 and     Folding is often observed in practice when viewing the frequency spectrum of real-valued samples, such as Fig.4..

Complex sinusoids 

Complex sinusoids are waveforms whose samples are complex numbers, and the concept of negative frequency is necessary to distinguish them. In that case, the frequencies of the aliases are given by just:    Therefore, as    increases from    to       also increases (from    to 0).  Consequently, complex sinusoids do not exhibit folding.

Sample frequency 

When the condition    is met for the highest frequency component of the original signal, then it is met for all the frequency components, a condition called the Nyquist criterion. That is typically approximated by filtering the original signal to attenuate high frequency components before it is sampled. These attenuated high frequency components still generate low-frequency aliases, but typically at low enough amplitudes that they do not cause problems. A filter chosen in anticipation of a certain sample frequency is called an anti-aliasing filter.

The filtered signal can subsequently be reconstructed, by interpolation algorithms, without significant additional distortion.  Most sampled signals are not simply stored and reconstructed.  But the fidelity of a theoretical reconstruction (via the Whittaker–Shannon interpolation formula) is a customary measure of the effectiveness of sampling.

Historical usage 

Historically the term aliasing evolved from radio engineering because of the action of superheterodyne receivers. When the receiver shifts multiple signals down to lower frequencies, from RF to IF by heterodyning, an unwanted signal, from an RF frequency equally far from the local oscillator (LO) frequency as the desired signal, but on the wrong side of the LO, can end up at the same IF frequency as the wanted one. If it is strong enough it can interfere with reception of the desired signal. This unwanted signal is known as an image or alias of the desired signal.

The first use of the term ``aliasing" in this context is due to Blackman and Tukey in 1958.  In their preface to the Dover reprint  of this paper, they point out that the idea of aliasing had been illustrated graphically by Stumpf ten years earlier.

Angular aliasing 
Aliasing occurs whenever the use of discrete elements to capture or produce a continuous signal causes frequency ambiguity.

Spatial aliasing, particular of angular frequency, can occur when reproducing a light field or sound field with discrete elements, as in 3D displays or wave field synthesis of sound.

This aliasing is visible in images such as posters with lenticular printing: if they have low angular resolution, then as one moves past them, say from left-to-right, the 2D image does not initially change (so it appears to move left), then as one moves to the next angular image, the image suddenly changes (so it jumps right) – and the frequency and amplitude of this side-to-side movement corresponds to the angular resolution of the image (and, for frequency, the speed of the viewer's lateral movement), which is the angular aliasing of the 4D light field.

The lack of parallax on viewer movement in 2D images and in 3-D film produced by stereoscopic glasses (in 3D films the effect is called "yawing", as the image appears to rotate on its axis) can similarly be seen as loss of angular resolution, all angular frequencies being aliased to 0 (constant).

More examples

Audio example 

The qualitative effects of aliasing can be heard in the following audio demonstration. Six sawtooth waves are played in succession, with the first two sawtooths having a fundamental frequency of 440 Hz (A4), the second two having fundamental frequency of 880 Hz (A5), and the final two at 1760 Hz (A6). The sawtooths alternate between bandlimited (non-aliased) sawtooths and aliased sawtooths and the sampling rate is 22050 Hz. The bandlimited sawtooths are synthesized from the sawtooth waveform's Fourier series such that no harmonics above the Nyquist frequency are present.

The aliasing distortion in the lower frequencies is increasingly obvious with higher fundamental frequencies, and while the bandlimited sawtooth is still clear at 1760 Hz, the aliased sawtooth is degraded and harsh with a buzzing audible at frequencies lower than the fundamental.

Direction finding 
A form of spatial aliasing can also occur in antenna arrays or microphone arrays used to estimate the direction of arrival of a wave signal, as in geophysical exploration by seismic waves. Waves must be sampled more densely than two points per wavelength, or the wave arrival direction becomes ambiguous.

See also 

 Brillouin zone
 Glossary of video terms
 Jaggies
 Kell factor
 Sinc filter
 Sinc function
 Spectral leakage
 Stroboscopic effect
 Wagon-wheel effect

Notes

References

Further reading 

 Pharr, Matt; Humphreys, Greg. (28 June 2010). Physically Based Rendering: From Theory to Implementation. Morgan Kaufmann. . Chapter 7 (Sampling and reconstruction). Retrieved 3 March 2013.

External links
  by Tektronix Application Engineer
 Anti-Aliasing Filter Primer by La Vida Leica, discusses its purpose and effect on recorded images
 Interactive examples demonstrating the aliasing effect

Digital signal processing
Signal processing